The Waite Brick Block is a historic commercial building at 422-424 Main Street in Malden, Massachusetts.  Built in 1848, it is the oldest brick building in the city.  The three story Greek Revival building has a hip roof, from which three tapered chimneys project.  One corner of the building is curved, following the original junction of Main and Pleasant Streets.  Windows are topped by granite lintels, and the cornice has a line of brick dentil work.

The building was listed on the National Register of Historic Places in 1982, misspelled as "Waitt".

See also
National Register of Historic Places listings in Middlesex County, Massachusetts

References

Commercial blocks on the National Register of Historic Places in Massachusetts
Buildings and structures in Malden, Massachusetts
National Register of Historic Places in Middlesex County, Massachusetts
Commercial buildings completed in 1848
Greek Revival architecture in Massachusetts